Major Susan Oruni Lakot, is a Ugandan educator and military officer, who serves as an elected member of parliament representing the Uganda People's Defence Forces (UPDF) in the 10th Parliament (2016–2021).

Background and education
She was born on 7 July 1975, in Kitgum District, in the Northern Region of Uganda. She attended Kitgum Public Primary School, for her elementary schooling. She then went to "YY Okot Memorial College" in Kitgum, where she completed her O-Level studies. She obtained her High School Diploma, after completing her A-Level education at Bukoyo Secondary School, in Iganga Town, in 1993.

She was admitted to the National Teachers College (now part of Kyambogo University), graduating in 1999, with a Diploma in Secondary Education. Ten years later, she graduated from Ndejje University with a Bachelor of Education degree.

Career
According to her biography at the website of the Ugandan parliament, Susan Lakot began teaching at Bombo Army Secondary School, in 2003, as a civilian teacher. Three years later, she was promoted to the position of Deputy Head Teacher at the same school, still as a civilian.
 
She joined the UPDF in 2010. That same year, she was posted to the Uganda Junior Staff College, in Jinja, Jinja District, in the Eastern Region of Uganda. In 2011, she was elected to the 9th parliament (2011–2016). In 2016, she was re-elected to the 10th parliament (2016–2021).

Family
Major Susan Lakot is married to Sergeant Robert Abok, an officer in the Uganda Police Force.

See also
 Military of Uganda
 Flavia Byekwaso
 List of members of the tenth Parliament of Uganda
 Parliament of Uganda
 Uganda People's Defence Force

References

External links
Website of Parliament of Uganda

1975 births
Living people
Acholi people
Ugandan military personnel
Ndejje University alumni
Kyambogo University alumni
People from Kitgum District
People from Northern Region, Uganda
Members of the Parliament of Uganda
Military of Uganda
Uganda People's Defence Force
Ugandan women
21st-century Ugandan women politicians
21st-century Ugandan politicians